The 65th Airlift Squadron is part of the 15th Wing at Joint Base Pearl Harbor–Hickam, Hawaii.  It operates C-37 aircraft providing executive airlift in the Pacific theater.

Mission  
The squadron's mission is to provide global airlift to Commander, US Pacific Command and Commander, Pacific Air Forces, as well as distinguished visitor missions.

History

World War II

The 65th conducted aerial transportation and evacuation in the Pacific Theater of Operations from 26 July 1943-c. August 1945.

Reserve operation and Korean War mobilization
In Korea, the 65th carried out aerial evacuation and transportation operations between 9 May 1952 and 31 December 1952.

Reactivation and Berlin crisis mobilization

Pacific airlift
Beginning in 1992, flew specially configured C-135s, and later C-37 and C-40 aircraft, to provide global airlift to Commander, US Pacific Command and Commander, Pacific Air Forces, as well as distinguished visitor missions.

Lineage
 Constituted as the 65th Troop Carrier Squadron on 7 December 1942
 Activated on 12 December 1942
 Inactivated on 27 January 1946
 Activated in the reserve on 9 August 1947
 Redesignated 65th Troop Carrier Squadron, Medium on 27 June 1949
 Ordered to active service on 1 April 1951
 Inactivated on 1 January 1953
 Activated in the reserve on 1 January 1953
 Ordered to active service on 28 Oct 1962
 Relieved from active service on 28 Nov 1962
 Discontinued and inactivated on 1 July 1966
 Redesignated 65th Airlift Squadron on 20 February 1992
 Activated on 10 March 1992

Assignments
 403d Troop Carrier Group, 12 Dec 1942
 Fifth Air Force, 26 July 1943
 54th Troop Carrier Wing, 13 August 1943
 433d Troop Carrier Group, 9 November 1943
 403d Troop Carrier Group, 20 February 1945 – 27 January 1946
 419th Troop Carrier Group, 9 August 1947
 403 Troop Carrier Group, 27 June 1949 – 1 January 1953
 403 Troop Carrier Group, 1 January 1953
 442d Troop Carrier Group, 16 November 1957
 403d Troop Carrier Wing, 14 April 1959
 929th Troop Carrier Group, 11 January 1963 – 1 July 1966
 15th Air Base Wing, 10 March 1992
 15th Operations Group, 13 April 1992 – present

Stations

 Bowman Field, Kentucky, 12 December 1942
 Alliance Army Air Field, Nebraska, 18 December 1942
 Pope Field, North Carolina, 3 May 1943
 Baer Field Indiana, 19 June–14 July 1943
 Port Moresby, New Guinea, 26 July 1943 (air echelon operated from Tsili Tsili, New Guinea after 18 September 1943)
 Nadzab Airfield Complex, New Guinea, 9 October 1943 (air echelon operated from Tsili Tsili, New Guinea until 31 October 1943 and from Tadji, Papua New Guinea, 3 May–2 June 1944)
 Biak, 18 October 1944 (air echelon operated from Hill Field, Mindoro, after 24 January 1945)
 Morotai, Netherlands East Indies, 27 February 1945
 Dulag Airfield, Leyte, Philippines, 15 July 1945

 Clark Field, Luzon, Philippines, 27 January 1946
 Richmond Army Air Base, Virginia, 9 August 1947
 Portland International Airport, Oregon, 27 June 1949 – 29 March 1952
 Ashiya Air Base, Japan, 14 April 1952 – 1 January 1953
 Portland International Airport, Oregon, 1 January 1953
 Paine Air Force Base, Washington, 15 April 1955
 Davis Field, Oklahoma, 16 November 1957 – 1 July 1966
 Hickam Air Force Base (later Joint Base Pearl Harbor–Hickam, Hawaii, 10 Mar 1992 – present)

Aircraft

 Douglas C-47 Skytrain (1943–1945)
 Curtiss C-46 Commando (1944–1945, 1947–1952)
 Fairchild C-119 Flying Boxcar (1952, 1953–1966)
 Boeing C-135 Stratolifter (1992–2003)
 Gulfstream C-37A Gulfstream V (2002–present)
 Boeing C-40B Clipper (2003–2019)

References

Notes

Bibliography

External links 

Military units and formations in Hawaii
065